Tillandsia superinsignis is a species of flowering plant in the genus Tillandsia. This species is endemic to Mexico.

Cultivars
 × Vrieslandsia 'Magic Wings'

References

BSI Cultivar Registry Retrieved 11 October 2009

superinsignis
Flora of Mexico